Port-Daniel may refer to:

 Port-Daniel–Gascons, a municipality on the north shore of Chaleur Bay in Le Rocher-Percé Regional County Municipality, Quebec, Canada
 Petite rivière Port-Daniel, a tributary of Chaleur Bay in Quebec, Canada
 Port-Daniel River, a tributary of Chaleur Bay in Quebec, Canada
 Rivière Port-Daniel du Milieu, a tributary of Chaleur Bay in Quebec, Canada
 Port-Daniel station, an inactive railway station formerly operated by Quebec Atlantic Oriental Railway in Port-Daniel–Gascons, Quebec, Canada